Originally synthesized by chemist Wayne E. Kenney, BAY 38-7271 (KN 38-7271) is a drug which is a cannabinoid receptor agonist developed by Bayer AG. It has analgesic and neuroprotective effects and is used in scientific research, with proposed uses in the treatment of traumatic brain injury. It is a full agonist with around the same potency as CP 55,940 in animal studies, and has fairly high affinity for both CB1 and CB2 receptors, with Ki values of 2.91nM at CB1 and 4.24nM at CB2. It has been licensed to KeyNeurotek Pharmaceuticals for clinical development, and was in Phase II trials in 2008 but its development appears to have stopped.

References 

Cannabinoids
Indanes
Primary alcohols
Diphenyl ethers
Resorcinol ethers
Phenyl sulfonate ethers
Experimental drugs
Trifluoromethyl compounds